Shadluy, also rendered as Shadlu, may refer to:
 Shadluy-e Olya
 Shadluy-e Sofla